The European Miracle: Environments, Economies and Geopolitics in the History of Europe and Asia is a book written by Eric Jones in 1981 to refer to the sudden rise of Europe during the late Middle Ages. Ahead of the Islamic and Chinese civilizations, Europe steadily rose since the Early modern period to a complete domination of  world trade and politics that remained unchallenged until the early 20th century.

This process started with the first European contacts and subsequent colonization of great expanses of the world. The Industrial Revolution further reinforced it.

Jones's book gave rise to the term European miracle. It is closely related to the idea of the Great Divergence, but the latter's focuses, rather than the origins of the rise of Europe during the Renaissance, is the 18th-century culmination of the process and the subsequent "imperial century" of Britain.

Summary
Jones aims to explain why did modern states and economies developed first in the peripheral and late-coming culture of Europe. He attempts to argue a concatenation of various factors, in particular the interplay of natural and economic factors that has worked to Europe's advantage and to the disadvantage of its Asian competitors.

The European miracle theory purports that the European nuclear family, with women marrying late and having few children, Europe's population was better controlled than in the rest of the world, which "multiplied insensately." Europe was thus not vulnerable to Malthusian Crises and so could form a progressive capitalist society.

Urbanization is also adduced as a factor. Crucially, the cities were also semi-autonomous, especially the Italian city-states. The growth of banking, accounting and general financial infrastructure in such cities is seen as unique and vital to the rise of Europe.

Reception
Jones's study is one of the most influential books dedicated to the question of European exceptionalism. Some historians, in particular of the "California school", have felt that Jones overstated the degree of difference between Europe and non-European regions on the eve of the Industrial Revolution.

The attention attracted by the book has also resulted in it being described by the American historian Joel Mokyr as "the whipping boy of those who have resented what they viewed as historiographical triumphalism, eurocentricity, and even racism." It has been attacked by thinkers such as James Blaut, Andre Gunder Frank, Kenneth Pomeranz, and John M. Hobson. They accuse Jones of Eurocentrism and "cultural racism" (Blaut's term).

See also
 Western empires
 Early Modern Europe
 Age of Exploration
 Dutch Golden Age
 Spanish Golden Age
 Pan-European identity
 Eurocentrism
 Great divergence
 The Enlightenment

Editions

References

Further reading

1981 non-fiction books
Early Modern period
Works about the theory of history